The Ruixiang Hoen O2 is an all-electric compact hatchback produced by the Chinese manufacturer BAIC Ruixiang.

Overview
The Hoen O2 was originally due to be released as the Qingcheng Shidai VC by Qingcheng Shidai (Shenzhen) Technology Co., Ltd. It was first unveiled during the 2021 Guangzhou Auto Show under the brand Qingcheng Shidai (轻橙时代) with a platform called EEZI STEP 1.0 developed by Qingcheng Shidai and planned to outsource hardware manufacturing from BAIC Ruixiang.

As of December 2022, patent images from BAIC Ruixiang shows a city car called Hoen O2 is in the progress of mass production which is the production version of the original Qingcheng Shidai VC.

According to Qingcheng Shidai, the original Qingcheng Shidai VC could obtain 200 km of range within 8 minutes charging time.

Jiangnan U2
In February 2023, news about an upcoming electric microcar by Jiangnan Automobile surfaced called the Jiangnan U2. The Jiangnan U2 vehicle body is heavily based on the Ruixiang Hoen O2, while the front and rear end designs are restyled to be produced at a lower cost.

References

Production electric cars
Cars introduced in 2021
Cars of China
Front-wheel-drive vehicles
City cars
Hatchbacks